is a Japanese lawyer, politician, novelist and former prosecutor.

She became a prosecutor in 1983, and worked at the United Nations Asia and Far East Institute for the Prevention of Crime and the Treatment of Offenders from 1993 to 1996.

Elected to the House of Councillors in 1998, Sasaki was engaged in introducing the Stalker Regulation Law of 2000. She served as the director of the Women's Affairs Division of the Liberal Democratic Party. She did not run for the election in 2004, but remains a member of the Party Ethics Committee of the LDP.  She is a leading advocate of capital punishment in the party.

She set up a law firm in 2004 and became a professor of law at Teikyo University in 2005.

As a novelist 
She won the Seishi Yokomizo Prize for Koibumi in 1992.

References

External links 
 弁護士 佐々木知子法律事務所 

Female members of the House of Councillors (Japan)
Members of the House of Councillors (Japan)
Liberal Democratic Party (Japan) politicians
Japanese mystery writers
Japanese women writers
Japanese women lawyers
Japanese prosecutors
Scholars of criminal law
Academic staff of Teikyo University
People from Hiroshima
1955 births
Living people
Women mystery writers
Women legal scholars